The Delaware River Viaduct is a reinforced concrete railroad bridge across the Delaware River about  south of the Delaware Water Gap that was built from 1908 to 1910 as part of the Lackawanna Cut-Off rail line.  It is the sister to the line's larger Paulinskill Viaduct.  The Delaware River Viaduct also crosses Interstate 80 on the east (New Jersey) side of the river and Slateford Road and the Lackawanna Railroad's "Old Road" (now Delaware-Lackawanna) on the west (Pennsylvania) side. Abandoned in 1983, it is part of an Amtrak proposal to introduce passenger service between Scranton, Pennsylvania and New York City, a distance of  miles.

It was considered the largest reinforced concrete structure in the world when it was completed in 1910.

Design and construction 
But the design was altered to include a tangent (straight) stretch of track across the bridge, a 1°30" curve on the New Jersey side and a 3°30" curve on the Pennsylvania side of the bridge. No other curves on the 28-mile cut-off were sharper than 2°.

Construction of the bridge was described in a 1909 article by Abraham Burton Cohen, then a draftsman for the Delaware, Lackawanna and Western Railroad, who went on to design the Tunkhannock Viaduct, an even larger structure on the railroad's Clarks Summit-Hallstead Cut-Off.

At its completion, the viaduct was thought to be the largest reinforced concrete structure built with a continuous pour process.

There is no known evidence to support the legend that several workers fell into the concrete during construction and could not be extracted because of the need to keep pouring.

The bridge was completed on December 1, 1910, about a year before the cut-off opened, which allowed construction trains to haul building materials to work sites east of the bridge.

Disuse and proposals for possible future use

The tracks on the viaduct were removed by Conrail in March 1989, five years after removal took place on the New Jersey section of the cut-off. Graffiti, cracking cement, other forms of concrete degradation and the growth of weeds all pose threats to structure following more than 30 years of disuse.  

As of 2019, the Pennsylvania Northeast Railroad Authority (PNRRA) is gathering funding to commission a study to update the 2009 estimates of the costs of restoring service, including the bridge repairs.

In September 2020, Amtrak proposed the restoration of rail service between Scranton and New York City at somepoint before 2035. The restoration of service along the Lackawana Railroad's previous route would require substantial repairs to the bridge as well as the reconstruction of the Lackawanna Cut-Off. In 2011, New Jersey Transit began reconstructing a  stretch of the  Lackawanna Cutoff in order to restore rail service to Andover, New Jersey.

See also
List of bridges documented by the Historic American Engineering Record in Pennsylvania
List of crossings of the Delaware River

References

External links

Touring the Lackawanna Cut-Off

Railroad bridges in New Jersey
Bridges over the Delaware River
Bridges in Warren County, New Jersey
Bridges completed in 1910
Lackawanna Cut-Off
Historic American Engineering Record in Pennsylvania
Delaware, Lackawanna and Western Railroad bridges
Viaducts in the United States
Arch bridges in the United States
Concrete bridges in the United States
Interstate railroad bridges in the United States
1910 establishments in New Jersey
Bridges in Northampton County, Pennsylvania
1910 establishments in Pennsylvania